Bedil can refer to:

 Bedil (term), a term used for various early firearms and gunpowder weapons from Maritime Southeast Asia
 Bedil tombak, one such firearm

Places
 Bedil, Çerkeş, in Çankırı Province, Turkey
 Bedil, Bartın, in Bartın Province, Turkey

People
 Abdul-Qādir Bedil (1642–1720), Sufi saint and poet
 Qadir Bux Bedil (1815–1873), Sufi poet and scholar
 Bedil Masroor (born 1947), Indian producer, writer and singer